François Vercauteren (born 28 October 1956), nicknamed "The Little Prince", is a Belgian former footballer who played as a left winger. He is currently unemployed after most recently managing Antwerp.

Club career 
Vercauteren made his first team debut for Anderlecht in 1975 against Racing Mechelen, replacing Gilbert Van Binst. A double surgery in October 1975 and January 1976, however, later slowed down his development. Vercauteren won the five European titles with Anderlecht (two European Cup Winners' Cups, one UEFA Cup and two European Supercups). He also won two Belgian Cups, four Belgian Championship titles and won the Belgian Supercup twice. In 1987, he joined Nantes in France and came back to Belgium three years later to play with Molenbeek until 1993. While at Nantes, Vercauteren finished twice the championship with the most assists.

International career 
Vercauteren played 63 times with the Belgium national team. He was part of the squad that finished fourth at the 1986 FIFA World Cup, and also featured in the 1982 World Cup and at UEFA Euro 1984. Though he made his national team debut on 16 November 1977 (a 3–0 defeat to Northern Ireland national football team), he was not selected for the Euro 1980, where Belgium finished runner-up to West Germany.

Coaching career 
At the end of his playing career, Vercauteren became the trainer of the youth team from C.S. Braine, a small club in Walloon Brabant.  A year after, he moved to KV Mechelen, where he first trained the youth team, then the first team, beginning in 1997–98. At the end of this season, he signed as an assistant manager at his first club as a player, Anderlecht.  He was briefly named manager along with his fellow Jean Dockx in the 1998–99 season after a disappointing start by manager Arie Haan (Anderlecht fell to the 18th and last place in the beginning of the season). The two men secured among others a nice 0–6 win at Sclessin against old rival Standard Liège and a 2–5 win at Genk, to come back in the European places.

Anderlecht then hired Aimé Anthuenis as a manager, and Vercauteren became assistant once again. After coach Hugo Broos (the successor of Anthuenis) was dismissed in February 2005, Vercauteren signed as the new manager and won twice the Belgian Championship. On 12 November 2007, after a string of poor and indifferent results, Vercauteren and Anderlecht parted company, with assistant coach Ariel Jacobs taking over until the end of the season.

From 9 April 2009 to 10 September 2009, Vercauteren served as caretaker manager for the Belgium national team, resigning after Belgium's defeat to Armenia on 9 September 2009; he was replaced by the Dutchman Dick Advocaat. On 3 December 2009, Vercauteren signed a contract as head coach for Genk. On 17 May 2011, he celebrated winning the 2010–11 Belgian Pro League championship with Genk after a 1–1 home draw against Standard Liège. He also won the 2011 Belgian Super Cup over Standard, and led his club into the qualifying play-off for the 2011–12 UEFA Champions League.

On 8 August 2011, Vercauteren signed a contract as head coach of Emirati side Al Jazira Club. On 11 March 2012, Al Jazira announced that they had parted company with Vercauteren. They stated the reason behind the controversial exit of Vercauteren was because he was not getting on with the players. On the same day, he was replaced by Caio Júnior.

Vercauteren joined Sporting CP in November 2012, but was sacked after two months, with the club winning just two games during his tenure.

Vercauteren then took over Russian club Krylia Sovetov Samara in the summer of 2014 following the club's relegation from the Russian Premier League. Krylia had spent every one of its 22 previous seasons on the top level. Under Vercauteren's management, Krylia Sovetov won the 2014–15 Russian Football National League and were promoted back to the Premier League.

In 2018, Vercauteren won promotion to the Belgian First Division A with his club Cercle Brugge. He then signed a contract with Saudi club Al-Batin.

On 3 October 2019, Vercauteren rejoined Anderlecht. On 17 August 2020, Vercauteren left Anderlecht.

Managerial statistics

Honours

Player 
Anderlecht
 Belgian First Division: 1980–81, 1984–85, 1985–86, 1986–87
 Belgian Cup: 1975–76
 Belgian Supercup: 1985, 1987
 European Cup Winners' Cup: 1975–76, 1977–78; runners-up 1976–77
 European Super Cup: 1976, 1978
 UEFA Cup: 1982–83; runners-up 1983–84
 Amsterdam Tournament: 1976
Tournoi de Paris: 1977
 Jules Pappaert Cup: 1977, 1983, 1985
 Belgian Sports Merit Award: 1978
 Bruges Matins: 1985

Belgium
 FIFA World Cup: 1986 (fourth place)

Manager 
Anderlecht
 Belgian First Division: 2005–06, 2006–07
 Belgian Supercup: 2006, 2007

Genk
 Belgian First Division: 2010–11
 Belgian Supercup: 2011

Krylia Sovetov
 National Football League: 2014–15

Cercle Brugge
 Promotion to Belgian First Division A: 2017–18

Individual 
 Belgian Golden Shoe: 1983
 Ballon d'Or nomination: 1983
 Belgian Professional Manager of the Year: 2010–11

References

External links

 

1956 births
Living people
People from Molenbeek-Saint-Jean
Belgian footballers
Belgian football managers
Belgium international footballers
Belgian expatriate footballers
FC Nantes players
Expatriate footballers in France
Belgian expatriate sportspeople in France
R.S.C. Anderlecht players
R.S.C. Anderlecht managers
1982 FIFA World Cup players
UEFA Euro 1984 players
1986 FIFA World Cup players
Belgian Pro League players
Ligue 1 players
Belgium national football team managers
K.R.C. Genk managers
K.V. Mechelen managers
PFC Krylia Sovetov Samara managers
Expatriate football managers in Russia
Belgian expatriate football managers
Belgian expatriate sportspeople in Russia
Russian Premier League managers
Al Jazira Club managers
Cercle Brugge K.S.V. managers
Al Batin FC managers
Oud-Heverlee Leuven non-playing staff
Royal Antwerp F.C. managers
Expatriate football managers in the United Arab Emirates
Belgian expatriate sportspeople in the United Arab Emirates
Expatriate football managers in Saudi Arabia
Association football wingers
UEFA Cup winning players
Saudi Professional League managers
Footballers from Brussels